1923 Országos Bajnokság I (men's water polo) was the 17th water polo championship in Hungary. There were six teams who played one round match for the title.

Final list 

* M: Matches W: Win D: Drawn L: Lost G+: Goals earned G-: Goals got P: Point

Sources 
Gyarmati Dezső: Aranykor (Hérodotosz Könyvkiadó és Értékesítő Bt., Budapest, 2002.)

1923 in water polo
1923 in Hungarian sport
Seasons in Hungarian water polo competitions